Ida Ayu Oka Rusmini, known as Oka Rusmini,  is an Indonesian poet and novelist. She is a recipient of the S.E.A. Write Award.

Biography
She was born in Jakarta, Indonesia. Her writing is characteristic of the condition of women in the patriarchal culture in traditional society.

Oka has to her credit collections of short stories, poems and novels. Oka's poem has also been included along with twelve other Balinese contributors in a book entitled Bali Living in Two Worlds, edited by Urs Ramseyer from the Museum der Kulturen Basel in Switzerland.

She has also served as the fashion editor in the Bali Post, the largest local newspaper in Bali. She has been speaking at various national and international literary forums, such as the Ubud Writers and Readers Festival in Bali; the Pulpit Poet 21st Century at Taman Ismail Marzuki, Jakarta in 1996; ASEAN Writers Writing Program, 1997; International Poetry Festival, Surakarta, 2002 and that in Denpasar, Bali in 2003. She represented Indonesia at the Winternachten Literature Festival in The Hague and Amsterdam, the Netherlands. In 2003, she was invited as a guest author at the University of Hamburg, Germany.

Awards
In 1994, she won the best short story prize for her entry "Putu Menolong Tuhan" in the Femina magazine, which was also translated as "Putu Helps his God" by Vern Cork and included in a book Bali Behind the Seen, published in Australia. In the same magazine, her novel "Sagra" won the prize for the novel category. This was followed by the Horizon literary magazine best short story award for her collection of stories entitled "Pemahat Abad", translated as The Sculptor of the Century, in the period 1999–2000. Her short story "The Century Carver" has been translated into English by Pamela Allen. Poetry Journal awarded her with the best poetry in 2002. In 2003, her novel Tarian Bumi, "Dance of the Earth" was hailed as the "Work Honorees Writing Literature 2003" by the Ministry of Education, Language Centre, Indonesia. The novel has been translated in German and is in process to be translated into English by Lontar Foundation.

Publications
 
 Utan Kayu: Tafseer in Games (1998)
 Bali: The Morning After (Australia, 2000)
 
 
 
 
 Boxwood (2003)
 
 
 
 
 
 
 
 
 Color We (2007)
 The Century Carver (2009)

References

External links
  Rereading Lives: "Century Carver" by Oka Rusmini
  PORTAL: Journal of Multidisciplinary International Studies, Vol 7, No 2 (2010): "Outcaste by Choice: Re-Genderings in a Short Story by Oka Rusmini"
  Inside Indonesia: "Marrying Up in Bali"
  Singapore Writers Festival

1967 births
Living people
Indonesian women novelists
Indonesian novelists
Indonesian women short story writers
Indonesian essayists
20th-century Indonesian women writers
21st-century Indonesian women writers
20th-century Indonesian poets
21st-century Indonesian poets
Indonesian newspaper editors
Udayana University alumni
People from Jakarta
Balinese people